The ZAP Alias Roadster is a plug-in electric three-wheeled sports car, from the American electric car maker ZAP in Santa Rosa – California, project initiated in 2007 through a collaboration between ZAP and Lotus Engineering, the UK-based automotive engineering company, who is assisting with the development of the vehicle.

Technical details
The vehicle has three wheels, two at the front, each containing an electric wheel-motor, and one at the rear, batteries are fitted underneath the vehicle in a reinforced composite battery box.
Supposed to go into production in 2009, the first Alias pre-production was unveiled at NADA 2009.

homologated as a motorcycle.

Automotive X Prize
The Progressive Insurance Automotive X Prize is a global competition to teams that win rigorous stage competition for clean, production-capable vehicles that exceed 100MPG energy equivalent(MPGe).

The Alias was one of the 136 vehicles from a total of 111 teams registered to enter the competition. It progressed preliminary stages at Michigan International Speedway, survived the shakedown that was completed on 13 May 2010, after which 22 teams remained. Driven by Al Unser Jr., qualified for the finals in July with other eight vehicles.
All battery-electric vehicles went through an efficiency and performance run held on 27 July, with the vehicles making 50 laps around the two-mile Michigan track without exceeding 70 miles per hour or dropping below 45 miles per hour in a chicane along the backstretch. The Alias, driving with a BorgWarner single-speed eGearDrive gearbox transmission, was eliminated in this last track event at the 97 miles out of 100 miles due to controller setting which activated the automatic safety system as a result slowed the vehicle and came to a stop, positioning the team at a final 4th place in the event.

References

External links
 Official website 
 The Alias on the ZAP website
 More renderings of Zap's next vapor EV

Electric sports cars
Electric three-wheel vehicles
Electric concept cars
Lotus vehicles